Irene Esther Ferreira Izquierdo (born March 22, 1976 in Caracas, Venezuela)  is a Venezuelan model and beauty pageant titleholder who won Miss Venezuela World 1994 and represented Venezuela at Miss World 1994 placed 2nd runner-up.

Miss Venezuela World

Miss World 1994
As the official representative of her country to the 1994 Miss World pageant held in Sun City, South Africa on November 19, 1994, she won the Best National Costume award, became Miss World Americas and placed second runner-up to eventual winner Aishwarya Rai of India.

References

External links
Miss Venezuela Official Website
Miss World Official Website

1976 births
Living people
Miss Venezuela World winners
Miss World 1994 delegates
People from Caracas